Betz may refer to:

 Betz (surname)
 Betz Airport, Michigan
 Betz cell, giant pyramidal neuron of primary motor cortex
 Betz's law, law of physics applying to fluids
 Betz, Oise, commune in France
 GE Betz, water treatment company

See also
 Betts, surname
 Willi Betz, logistics company